Sonchus wilmsii is a species of flowering plant in the family Asteraceae and is endemic to southern Africa. This species was first formally described in 1925 by Robert Elias Fries in Acta Horti Bergiana and it grows in grassland in Cape Provinces, Free State, KwaZulu-Natal, Lesotho, Mozambique, Northern Provinces and Eswatini in southern Africa.

References

Plants described in 1925
wilmsii
Flora of Africa
Taxa named by Robert Elias Fries